Beautiful Soup may refer to:

 "Beautiful Soup", a song in the 1865 novel Alice's Adventures in Wonderland by Lewis Carroll
 "Beautiful Soup", a 1992 dystopian satire by Harvey Jacobs
 "Beautiful Soup", a 2014 work by Australian composer Leon Coward
 Beautiful Soup (HTML parser), an HTML parser written in the Python programming language

See also
 Boeing Duveen and The Beautiful Soup, a British psychedelic rock band of the 1960s
 Soup, Beautiful Soup and South American Kitchen, a book by Felipe Rojas-Lombardi